The 2014 Women's International Match Racing Series was a series of match racing sailing regattas staged during 2014 season.

Regattas

Standings

References

External links
 Official website

2014
2014 in women's sailing